Phyllis B Munday, CM (née James) (24 September 1894 – 11 April 1990) was a Canadian mountaineer, explorer, naturalist and humanitarian. She was famed for being the first woman to reach the summit of Mount Robson (with Annette Buck) in 1924, and with her husband Don for discovering Mount Waddington, and exploring the area around it via the Franklin River and the Homathko River. Awarded the Order of Canada in 1972 for her work with the Girl Guides of Canada and St. John Ambulance as well as for her mountaineering career. Phyllis's Engine, a prominent rock spire in the Pacific Ranges near Mount Garibaldi, was despite claims to the contrary named for Phyllis Beltz.

Mount Munday is named after Don and Phyllis Munday, and Baby Munday Peak is named for their daughter Edith

Early life
Phyllis was born in Sri Lanka, moved to the British Columbia interior in 1901, and then to Vancouver in 1907.

In 1912 she climbed Grouse Mountain with her Girl Guide company.

In 1915, at 21, Phyllis joined the British Columbia Mountaineering Club and began going on club trips to such places as Mount Seymour, The Lions, Mount Tantalus and Mount Garibaldi.

Meeting Don
Phyllis met her future husband in 1918. While on a mountaineering trip an incident occurred which, in Don's words, "lends itself readily to being given a romantic aspect." Don lost his footing on a glacial moraine, and was in danger of slipping into a crevasse. Phyllis jumped to help him  restore his balance, and in so doing lost hers. Don managed to grab and steady her until she could regain her feet.

They married in February 1920, spending their honeymoon in a cabin on Dam Mountain near Vancouver. Their daughter, Edith was born in 1921, and at 11 weeks she was carried to the top of Crown Mountain.

From 1923 to 1926 the Mundays lived in a tent, and then a cabin on Grouse Mountain where Don worked cutting a trail from Lonsdale Avenue in North Vancouver, British Columbia to the summit, while Phyllis ran the Alpine Lodge, serving hot drinks and meals to hikers.

Exploration of the Waddington Range

In 1925, while on a trip to Mount Arrowsmith, Vancouver Island, Don and Phyllis Munday spotted what they believed to be a peak taller than Mount Robson, the then accepted tallest peak entirely within British Columbia. In the words of Don Munday
"The compass showed the alluring peak stood along a line passing a little east of Bute Inlet and perhaps 150 miles away, where blank spaces on the map left ample room for many nameless mountains." While there is some debate as to whether the peak they saw was indeed Mount Waddington (in fact, Don Munday himself observed that the feat is impossible), they almost certainly saw a peak in the Waddington Range, and this led the Mundays to explore that area, and discover the mountain in fact.

Over the next decade, the Munday's mounted several expeditions into the area in an attempt to climb it. Known to them as "The Mystery Mountain", in 1927 the height was measured at 13,260 feet (by triangulation by BC Land Surveyor J.T. Underhill), and the Canadian Geographic Board gave it the name Mount Waddington after Alfred Waddington who was a proponent of a railway through the Homathko River valley. They reached the lower summit in 1928, deeming the main summit too risky.

Significant events

 1894 born in Sri Lanka
 1916 founded the Girl Guide movement in British Columbia
 1920 established the first St. John Ambulance brigade in North Vancouver, British Columbia
 1938 honorary lifetime membership in the Alpine Club of Canada
 1972 inducted into the Order of Canada 
 1998 stamp imprinted in her honour

First ascents
 1922 Parapet Peak  
 1922 Isosceles Peak
 1923 Blackcomb Peak
 1923 Overlord Mountain
 1924 Foley Peak
 1930 Mount Munday
 1931 Sockeye Peak
 1936 Silverthrone Mountain
 1942 Mount Queen Bess
 1946 Reliance Mountain

Honors
Honorary member, Appalachian Mountain Club
Honorary member, Ladies' Alpine Club of Great Britain (1936)
Honorary member, American Alpine Club (1967)

Notes

References
 
 
 
 Munday at 100 Canadian Heroines. Famous and Forgotten Faces. By Merna Forster; Google books, pp 187 – 190

1894 births
1990 deaths
Members of the Order of Canada
Canadian mountain climbers
Canadian sportswomen
Female climbers